The Capitol Theatre in downtown Moncton, New Brunswick, Canada is an 780-seat, restored 1920s-era vaudeville house on Main Street that serves as the centre for cultural entertainment for the city. Designed by René-Arthur Fréchet in 1920, it was rebuilt by Fréchet in 1926 after it burned.  Having been converted to a cinema early in its history, the theatre was purchased by the City of Moncton in 1991, restored to its original look commencing in 1992, and was officially reopened as a performance space in 1993. It hosts the productions of Theatre New Brunswick and The Atlantic Ballet Theatre of Canada, as well as symphony orchestra and dance performances.

References

External links
Official Website

Culture of Moncton
Buildings and structures in Moncton
Theatres in New Brunswick
Music venues in New Brunswick
Tourist attractions in Moncton
Former cinemas in Canada